Michel Beaudry (born June 12, 1941) is a former judge of the Federal Court of Canada.

References

1941 births
Living people
Judges of the Federal Court of Canada